Trump National Golf Club, Los Angeles is a public golf club in Rancho Palos Verdes, California with a  course designed by Pete Dye and Donald J. Trump Signature Design. It is owned by The Trump Organization.

Trump National Golf Club Los Angeles was formerly known as Ocean Trails Golf Club, an 18–hole course designed by Pete Dye, which was about to open when a landslide occurred in June 1999, and the 18th hole slid toward the Pacific Ocean. The Ocean Trails Golf Club subsequently went into bankruptcy, and on November 26, 2002, Trump bought the property for $27 million, intending to redesign the course. It includes a  clubhouse.

It is ranked among the Top 100 Courses You Can Play by Golf Magazine.

The club is known for its views of the Pacific Ocean and Catalina Island. The course featured three artificial waterfalls until they were removed during the 2012–15 drought. The Michael Douglas Pro-Celebrity and Friends Golf Tournament takes place there annually, in April.

At a total cost of $264 million, it would be the most expensive golf course ever constructed. Trump's representatives claimed the course was worth $10 million in dealing with the L.A. County property tax  assessor two years after the course opened.

History

Trump National's predecessor, the Ocean Trails Golf Club, was part of a  property owned by developer Edward Zuckerman and a partner. Prior to the Zuckerman purchase, the property was used as a farm. The golf course is on the Palos Verdes Peninsula known for its landslides. The stratification of the sedimentary rock below the course is visible in the high cliffs of the area as it gradually slopes seaward. The sloping and stratification create favorable conditions for the generation of landslides. As a result, homes and roads have been lost to the ocean in that area. In the area occupied by the golf course and its vicinity, there are three ancient landslides which have been named by geologists as A, B and C respectively. The green of the Ocean Trails golf course 18th hole and half of its fairway were on top of ancient landslide C.

The landslide caused most of the 496 yard par 4 18th hole to slide  toward the ocean, including the fairway and green.

Also due to the slide, bike paths, walking paths, the edge of the bluffs and a segment of an LA County sewer line disappeared. It is believed that fluid discharge from the sewer line, probably leaking before the slide, acted as a lubricant on the thin underlying layer of bentonite, which became saturated with liquid sewage in turn, and this acted as a facilitator for the stratified geological accumulations to slide relative to each other. Bentonite, a form of clay, exhibits a low frictional coefficient when wet, i.e. it becomes slippery. The golf course opened with only 15 holes because of the landslide.

The landslide caused the Ocean Trails Golf Course construction project to go into bankruptcy. Covered by insurance funds, a massive geotechnical project was launched to reconstruct the 18th hole using 1,250,000 cubic yards of earth to fill it. The stabilization work and the slide caused cosmetic damage to the course. At the time, golf course historian Geoff Shackelford said that at the then projected cost of repair of more than $20 million, the 18th hole would have been "the most expensive single hole in history".

After three years, legal issues between the involved banks and developers caused the geological stabilization work to stop. In 2002 Donald Trump stepped in and bought the  property, including the golf course, with the intention of finalizing construction and repairs by the summer of 2003. On January 20, 2006 the 18-hole Trump National Golf Club opened in Los Angeles. The reinforcement fill designed to stabilize the area affected by the slide is located under holes 17 and 18. During the massive geological stabilization process the golf course was open for business.

The geological stabilization process was based on a geotechnical design involving the use of geosynthetic materials designed to enhance the cohesion and strength of the landslide fill. Asked about the safety of the work, Trump said: "If I'm ever in California for an earthquake, this is where I want to be standing".

In 2008 Trump sued the city of Rancho Palos Verdes for $100 million, alleging that the city did not allow him to make the improvements needed to maintain the Trump image. The lawsuit was settled in 2012 for undisclosed terms.

In 2015, the course was to have become the host of the PGA Grand Slam of Golf.  The tournament was cancelled due to Trump's comments about illegal immigrants. Sports teams and charities continued to move their charity-golf tournaments to other venues during his presidency.

Media
The Trump National Los Angeles was the setting for the filming of Golf Channel's The Big Break VI: Trump National.

The Trump National Los Angeles was also the setting for the golf course shots in "50 First Dates", with Catalina Island clearly seen in some of the shots.

In the 2008 film Step Brothers, the course was used for the "Catalina Wine Mixer" scenes, doubling as Catalina Island.

In the 2014 film Horrible Bosses 2, the 'cancel the order' scene was filmed at the golf course. 

The Modern Family 2014 episode The Wedding (Part 2) was filmed at the golf course. 

In 2016 it was the filming location for and the subject of the Adult Swim special The Adult Swim Golf Classic which depicted Trump National Los Angeles hosting a golf tournament in 1966 sponsored by the fictional cigarette company Portnoy 100s.

See also
 Donald Trump and golf
List of things named after Donald Trump

References

External links

Golf clubs and courses in California
Palos Verdes Peninsula
Landslides in the United States
Assets owned by the Trump Organization
Landslides in 1999
Donald Trump real estate